Moira is a 2015 Georgian drama film directed by Levan Tutberidze. It premiered at the 2015 San Sebastián International Film Festival. It was selected as the Georgian entry for the Best Foreign Language Film at the 88th Academy Awards but it was not nominated.

Cast
 Paata Inauri

See also
 List of submissions to the 88th Academy Awards for Best Foreign Language Film
 List of Georgian submissions for the Academy Award for Best Foreign Language Film

References

External links
 

2015 films
2015 drama films
2010s Georgian-language films
Drama films from Georgia (country)